The Military ranks of Mongolia are the military insignia used by the Mongolian Armed Forces and other military organisations such as Border defense troops, Internal troops, National emergency management agency, General executive agency of Court decision, General intelligence agency, and the State special security department.

Current ranks and insignia
Current rank system is established in 2003 by introducing Sergeant major and Master sergeant ranks. In 2006 Brigadier general, General ranks were introduced and Colonel general, General of the Army ranks were abolished. Current set of rank insignia introduced in 2017. Officers insignia ulzii replaced by five-pointed star and non-commissioned officers insignia pattern replaced by chevrons.

Enlisted personnels

Non-commissioned officers

Commissioned Officers ranks and insignia

Shoulder board of government officials

Branch and service color 
Colors padding of shoulder boards and piping on uniforms are used in order to represent the type of branch or military organization.

Historical

Ranks and insignia from 1990 to 1998
In 1990, by the decree of Presidium of People's great khural, officers and non-commissioned officers insignia changed to 1936 design ulzii and "AA" letters of abbreviation People's army removed from enlisted personnel's shoulder board.

Officers

Non-commissioned officers and Enlisted personnels

Ranks and insignia from 1998 to 2017
In 1998, by the Presidential decree No.180, new uniform and rank insignia design approved. In 2011 generals shoulder board insignia ulzii changed to five pointed star and camouflage pattern of all field uniforms and shoulder boards changed to 4-tone digital pattern.

Officers

Non-commissioned officers and Enlisted personnels

Black variant of shoulder board
Black embroidery variant of officers and NCO's shoulder board was used mainly in peacekeeping missions.

See also
 Military ranks of the Mongolian People's Republic

References

Mongolia
Military of Mongolia